The 1969 Men's World Team Squash Championships were held in The Midlands, England and took place from February 03 to February 12, 1969.

Results

See also 
World Team Squash Championships
World Squash Federation
World Open (squash)

References 

World Squash Championships
Squash tournaments in the United Kingdom
International sports competitions hosted by England
Men's World Team Squash Championships
Mens
Squash in England
Men's World Team Squash Championships